Mark Herring may refer to:
Mark Herring (born 1961), Virginia Attorney General 
Mark Herring (swimmer), New Zealand swimmer, who swam at the 2008 Olympics

See also
Marc Herring, multimedia artist and businessman